The Battle of San Marcial, waged on 31 August 1813, was one of the last battles fought on Spanish soil during the Peninsular War.

At San Marcial, just outside Irún, close to the French border, Spain's Army of Galicia, led by General Freire, turned back Marshal Soult's last major offensive against the army of Britain's Wellington.

Background
Wellington approached San Sebastián in the aftermath of the Vitoria campaign and put the city under siege in July 1813, aiming to reduce the important coastal fortress while the French army withdrew eastwards, nursing its wounds from Vitoria. San Sebastián and Pamplona sat on Wellington's flanks, guarding the approaches to the French border, and needed to be pried from French hands before the allies could pursue operations into France. However, it appears Wellington misjudged the resourcefulness and determination of the French garrison and its commander, General of Brigade Rey. British assaults sustained very bloody repulses, losing 600 killed in a 26 July attack. Before Wellington could organize a new effort, news reached him that Soult had rebuilt the French field army and reappeared to the east—weeks earlier than Wellington had believed possible—and the allies broke off the siege to confront him.

While Wellington faced off against Soult at the Battle of the Pyrenees, Lieutenant General Graham maintained a blockade of San Sebastián and prepared for the resumption of the siege on 26 August. A line of light fortifications was put up to guard against a relief effort by Soult, and a strong cordon was established up to the banks of the Bidasoa. In addition to the Anglo-Portuguese divisions at Vera, Lesaca, and Irun, this screen included the Spanish 3rd, 5th, and 7th divisions on the San Marcial heights, as well as two brigades of the 4th division in reserve (forming Freire's 4th Army, or Army of Galicia). 

After four weeks of rest, Soult was, in fact, preparing one last push toward San Sebastián, concentrating all his nine divisions at Ainhoue for an attack in the vicinity of San Marcial. Neither the French nor the Spanish troops were in perfect spirits; the French were demoralized by their recent retreats and their heart was not in the coming fight, while Freire's ragged troops, neglected by the Spanish commissariat, had not enjoyed full rations in several days. Behind them, the allied army was locked in a terrible struggle for San Sebastián that would cost it 2,376 dead and wounded on 31 August alone.

Battle

In an early morning mist, seven French divisions crept toward the Bidassoa on August 31, fording the river under cover of their guns. The allied positions at Vera and Irun were surprised and overrun but not before having alerted Freire, who drew his troops into a line on the heights. The Imperial columns lost all cohesion as they climbed over the difficult terrain, reaching Freire in a confused mass. The Spaniards welcomed them with a scathing volley and, advancing with fixed bayonets, forced Soult's leading divisions back down the hill.

Soult rallied the broken units at noon and committed fresh troops to a second assault on the heights, but the line of Spanish bayonets held firm against his final assault and the faltering French were badly beaten. Unable to keep his men from retreating back over the river, Soult ordered a withdrawal back to Irun and called off his offensive without having met a single red coat: When, towards the end of the battle, Freire requested reinforcements from the British to shore up his battered line, Wellington replied, "As he has already won his victory, he should keep the honour of it for his countrymen alone." San Sebastián fell after a fearful battle later that day, and Soult retreated into France.

Combat of Vera
During the afternoon, a violent thunderstorm struck the area and brought in torrents of rain. By the time General of Division Bertrand Clausel's rearguard reached the fords over the Bidassoa, there were six feet of water over them. The rearguard commander, General of Division Vandermaesen, led 10,000 men upstream to Vera (Bera). The  bridge at Vera would only admit a column three or four men wide, but it was the only possible escape route. A 70-man company of the green-jacketed, rifle-armed British 95th Regiment under Captain Daniel Cadoux held the village with two sentries posted at the bridge. At 2:00 am on 1 September, the French successfully rushed the bridge, but could go no farther. In the heavy rain, the muskets of the French would not fire so they had to resort to the bayonet. Meanwhile, the British riflemen were secure with dry gunpowder in loopholed buildings. Over and over, the French tried to rush the buildings at the end of the bridge, but they were mown down in heaps by rifle fire.

Cadoux sent for assistance from a brigade of the Light Division that was camped a mile away. Incredibly, Major General Skerrett refused to send help. Instead, he ordered Cadoux to withdraw. The captain refused to obey and held his post against repeated attacks. At length, Skerrett repeated his order to withdraw. Cadoux, who had only lost his two sentries, reluctantly prepared to obey. However, it was now dawn, the rain had stopped and the gunpowder of the French was now dry. As the green-jackets abandoned the buildings, the French opened fire, killing Cadoux and 16 of his men and leaving many more wounded. Abandoning their artillery, the French filed over the now-undefended span to escape from the trap. Vandermaesen lay among the dead.

Aftermath
The battle marked the end of Soult's once redoubtable fighting force: "war-weary and despondent, Soult's divisions had lost all heart and, except in a few inspired flashes, were never again to fight with their once customary skill and zeal". 

The Spanish army's performance at San Marcial, together with that of General Zayas's Division at the Battle of Albuera and General Castaños's army at the Battle of Bailén, was among its best efforts of the Peninsular War. The next action would be the Battle of the Bidassoa, on 7 October.

See also
Battle of the Pyrenees
Battle of Nivelle

Notes

References

Sources

External links

Battles of the Peninsular War
Battles of the Napoleonic Wars
Battles involving Spain
Battles involving France
Battles involving the United Kingdom
Battles in the Basque Country (autonomous community)
Basque history
Battle of San Marcial
Battle of San Marcial
August 1813 events